The Little Willis River is a  tributary of the Willis River in the U.S. state of Virginia. It is part of the James River watershed.

See also
List of rivers of Virginia

References

USGS Hydrologic Unit Map - State of Virginia (1974)

Rivers of Virginia
Tributaries of the James River
Rivers of Buckingham County, Virginia
Rivers of Cumberland County, Virginia